This is an alphabetical list of known Hindi songs performed, sung and/or recorded by Mohammed Rafi between 1942 and 1980.  Over 5,000 of his songs are listed here. Mohammed Rafi also sang in several different languages other than Hindi such as Punjabi, Marathi etc.  Some of which are also listed here.

O 

(154)

 "O Ambe Maiya Ayo Ayo Navratri Tyohar (Duet Mukesh - Kalyanji-Anandji/Qamar Jalalabadi-Indeevar) - Johar Mehmood In Hong Kong 1971"
 "O Awara Abdullah Yeh Pyar Ka Halla Gulla (Duet Geeta Dutt - Datta Naik/Asad Bhopali) - Awara Abdulla  1963"
 "O Babu Aji Babu Gali Mein Teri Chaand Chamak Dekho (Solo - C. RamChandra/Qamar Jalalabadi) - Saajan 1947"
 "O Babu Tel Maalish (Duet Manna Dey - Chitragupt/Majrooh Sultanpuri) - Baraat 1960"
 "O Balam Tere Pyar Ki Thandi Aag Mein Jalte Jalte, O Ho ..Main To Haar Gayi Re, Ho O Loot Liya Dil Tu Ne Mera Raah Mein Chalte Chalte, O Ho ..Naina Maar Gayi Re (Duet Asha Bhosle - Naushad Ali/Shakeel Badayuni) - Ram Aur Shyam 1967"      [Ho ...]
 "O Balle Balle Sardar Ji Di Gal Suno (Duet G. M. Durrani - Shankar-JaiKishan and Ken Jones/Unknown) - Taarzan Meraa Saathi 1974"
 "O Ballo Soch Ke Mele Jana  (Duet Asha Bhosle - Ravi/Rajendra Krishan) - Khandaan 1965"      [Kahaan Chali, Kahaan Chali, Kahaan Chali, Mele Mele Mele ...]
 "O Barkha Mujhe Sach Sach Bata (Duet Asha Bhosle - Ravindra Jain/Ravindra Jain) - Toofan 1975"
 "O Bashira O Jameela, O Jameela Chhamaak Chhaloo, Jameela Rukh Se Parda Utha De (Duet Asha Bhosle - Madan Mohan Kohli/Kaifi Azmi) - Parwana 1971"
 "O Beta Alfoo, Farmao Chacha Salfoo (Duet S. Balbir - S. D. Batish/Rahil Gorakhpuri) - Hum Bhi Kuchh Kam Nahin 1958"
 "O Bhape Na Shrma, Kuch Garmi Sardi Kha, Aaj Khushi Ka Din Hain Pyare, Jab Bhi Wappi Pa (Swing - Ravi) - Sagaai 1966"
 "O Bichhade Huye Saathi (Duet Lata Mangeshkar - Mohammad Shafi/Khumar BaraBanKavi) - Hulchul 1951"
 "O Butter Butter Yes Boss Yes Boss, Joote Pade Hain Itne Sar Pe (Duet Samindar - Sardul Kwatra/Bismil Ludhianvi) - Kala Chashma 1962"
 "O Chaliya Re Chaliya Re Man Mein Hamar, Nazar Tori dhas Gayi (Dandiya Lata Mangeshkar - Naushad Ali) - Ganga Jamuna 1961"
 "O Chalo Rani Karo Na Manmani (Duet Geeta Dutt - S. Mohinder/Majrooh Sultanpuri) - Sau Ka Note 1955" 
 "O Chanda Re Door Na Ja Re (Duet Suman Kalyanpur - P. Nageshwar Rao/Saraswati Kumar Deepak) - Chakravarty Vikramaditya 1964"
 "O Chhokri (Duet Suman Kalyanpur - N. Dutta aka Datta Naik/Sahir Ludhianvi) - Bhai Behan 1959"
 "O Data De Hum Ko Bhi Ek Pyara Bangla (Duet Asha Bhosle - Roshan Lal/Prem Dhawan) - Aji Bas Shukriya 1958"
 "O Daulat Ke Gulam (Duet Asha Bhosle - Usha Khanna) - Roop Rupaiyaa 1968"      [Dekhi Zamane Ki Humne Yeh Reet Karti Hain Duniya Daulat Se Preet 2 ...]
 "O Deewane Chhokare, Raah Meri Na Rok Re, Bahot Bura Hain, Beech Raah Mein, Takarane Ka Shauk Re, O Deewane Chhokare (Duet Asha Bhosle - G. S. Kohli) - Lambe Haath 1960"      [Haaye ...] 
 "O Deke Badnaami Zamane Bhar Ki (Duet Asha Bhosle - Rosahn Lal/Prem Dhawan) - Madhu 1959"
 "O Devtao Hosh Mein Aao (Solo - Avinash Vyas/Kavi Pradeep) - Naag Mani 1957"
 "O Dil Janiya O Dil Janiya Main To Kanton Pe Chala Pada Re 3 (Solo - Laxmikant-Pyarelal) - Naach Uthe Sansaar 1975"
 "O Dil Ki Keetab Kori Hai Kori Hi Rehene Do (Duet Suman Kalyanpur - Shankar-Jaikishan) - Yaar Mera 1971"
 "O Dil Zakhmon Se Choor, Magar Tu Kya Jane, Magar Tu Kya Jane, ..O Pyar Ki Manzil Door, Magar Tu Kya Jane, Magar Tu Kya Jane, ..O Dil Zakhmon Se Choor, Magar Tu Kya Jane, Magar Tu Kya Jane (Duet Geeta Roy - Husnlal-Bhagatram/Sasar Sailani) - Aadhi Raat 1950"
 "O Dilbar Janiye Tere Hain Hum Tere Chhupa Lenge Inn Aankhon Mein (Solo - Kalyanji-Anandji/Prakash Mehra) - Haseena Maan Jayegi 1968 and Mohammed Rafi Collection Vol. 6 ****"
 "O DilJaniya (Solo - Laxmikant-Pyarelal/Majrooh Sultanpuri) - Naach Uthe Sansaar 1976"
 "O Dilruba Aa Nazar Mila (Duet Asha Bhosle - Nisar Bazmi-Chik Choklet/Majrooh Sultanpuri) - Kar Bhala 1956"
 "O Dilwalo Matwalo (Solo - Laxmikant-Pyarelal/Anand Bakshi) - Taqdeer 1967"
 "O Diwane Chhokre Raah Meri (Duet Asha Bhosle - G. S. Kohli/Anjaan) - Lambe Haath 1960"
 "O Door Ke Musafir Hum Ko Bhi SAath Le Le (Solo - Naushad Ali/Shakeel Badayuni) - Uran or Udan Khatola 1954"      [Chale Aaj Tum Jahan Se Huyi Zindagi Parayi ...]
 "O Duniya Bana Ne Walein (Duet Shamshad Begum - Govind Ram/Ramesh Gupta0 - Jeevan Nauka 1952"
 "O Duniya Ke RakhawAale Sun Dard Bhare Mere NAale (Prayer Solo - Naushad Ali) - Baiju Bawra 1952"      [Bhagwan Bhagwan Bhagwan ...]  (Rafi was almost wakening God himself via this song…  Powerful prayer)
 "O Gadiwale (Duet Shamshad Begum - Naushad Ali/Shakeel Badayuni) - Mother India 1957"
 "O Gawalan Kyun Mera Mann, Teri Chitwan De Gayi, O Gawalan Kyun Mera Mann, Teri Chitwan De Gayi, Baansuri Ki Taan Pyari Beqarari De Gayi, Baansuri Ki Taan Pyari Beqarari De Gayi (Janmashthami Solo - Hemant Kumar/Rajindra Krishan) - Champakali 1957" 
 "O Geet Nahin Ban Sakte (Duet Asha Bhosle - Laxmikant-Pyarelal/Anand Bakshi) - Do Bhai 1969"
 "O Giridhari O Mere Shyam ..Jai Krishna Hare (Janmashthami Prayer Manna Dey - O. P. Nayyar/Ahmed Wasi) - Heera Moti 1978"
 "Oh Gori Yun Hi Sharam Mujhse Jo Karti Rah (Duet Asha Bhosle - Kalyanji-Anandji/Vishweshwar Sharma) - Anjaam II  1978"
 "O Hamdam Jhum Le Jara (Solo Twist - Bappi Lahiri) - Haiwan 1977"
 "O Haseena Zulfon Wali Jaane Jahan (Duet Asha Bhosle - R. D. Burman/Majrooh Sultanpuri) - Teesri Manzil 1966"
 "O Ho O O O O O O Ha Ha Ha Aa Aa Aa Awara Maajhi Awara Maajhi Jayega Kahan Us Ka To Sahil Tum Ho Jahaan (Solo - Laxmikant-Pyarelal/Majrooh Sultanpuri) - Pyasi Sham 1969"
 "O Ho Tum Hanse To Gham Sharamaya Ji Gham Sharmaya, O Ho Tum Hanse To Gham Sharamaya Ji Gham Sharmaya, ..O O O O O O, O O O O O O  ..O Ho Tum Hanse To Gham Sharamaya Ji, Gham Sharmaya, Dil Jhoom Jhoom Lehraya, Dil Jhoom Jhoom Lehraya, Dil Jhoom Jhoom Lehraya, Dil Jhoom Jhoom Lehraya, O Ho Tum Hanse To Gham Sharamaya Ji Gham Sharmaya (Duet Shamshad Begum - Mohan Jr./) - Dana Paani 1953" 
 "O Itne Bade Bhagwan Dil De Makan (Multi Prem Nath and Surendra - Vasant Desai/Allama Iqbal, Deewan Sharar or S.R. Saaj) - Hindustan Hamara 1950"
 "O Jaan Ji Zara Mud Ke To Dekh Lo Jate Jate, O Maangoo Na Koi Khairat [Cycle Ring] Maangoo Na Koi Khairat, Chahoo Na Koi Sauraat, Meri Sunti Jana Baat Kudiye, Jate Jate, O Zara Jate Jate, Zara Mud Ke To Dekh Kudiye, Jate Jate O Zara Jate Jate [Cycle Ring] (Solo - Kalyanji-Anandji/Mahendra Dehlvi) - Lalkaar 1965"   
 "O Jaane Wale Chand Zara Muskura Ke Ja (Solo - Shyam Sundar/Qamar Jalalabadi) - Bazaar 1949"
 "O Jaane Wale Yeh Kya Kiya (Solo - Hansraj Behl/Tahir Lakhnavi) - Kisi Ki Yaad 1950"      [Sukh Chin Liya Dukh Chod Diya, Dil Hansi Hansi Mein Tod Diya, O O  ...]
 "O Jai Bum Bhola (Duet Asha Bhosle - Ravi/Sahir Ludhianvi) - Kaajal 1965"      [Zara Si Aur Pila Do Bhang Main Aaaya Dekh Ke Aisa Rang Ke Dil Mera Dola ...]
 "O Jane Wale Ja Zara Muskura Ke Ja (Solo - ShyamSundar/Qamar Jalalbadi) - Bazar 1949" 
 "O Jane Wale Sun Zara Yeh Dil Ka Majara Tumhin Se Humein Pyar Tha Tumhin Se Humein Pyar Hain, Jao Ji Maine Sun Liya Yeh Dil Ka Majara, Tumhein Kabhi Pyar Tha Na Tumhein Pyar Hain (Duet Lata Mangeshkar - Kalyanji-Anandji/Qamar Jalalabadi) - Preet Na Jane Reet 1964"
 "O Jatta Aayi Baisakhi (Solo - Laxmikant-Pyarelal-Anand Bakshi) - Imaan Dharam 1977"
 "O Jeena Kis Kaam Ka Jo Kut Jaaye Aaram Se Chaar Chaand Lag Jate Is mein Doud Dhoop ke Naam Se Doud Dhoop, Doud Dhoop, Doud Dhoop (Solo - S. Naresh and Hansraj Behl) - Doud Dhoop 1980"
 "O Jhuke Jhuke Nainon Wali (Duet Asha Bhosle - Shankar-Jaikishan/Rajendra Krishan) - Chhote Sarkaar 1974"
 "O Jiya O, Jiya O Jiya Kuchh Bol Do, Are O O Dil Ka Parda Khol Do, O Jiya O, Jiya O Jiya Kuchh Bol Do, Are O O Dil Ka Parda Khol Do Aa Ha Ha Ha ..Jab Pyar Kisi Se Hota Hain, To Dard Sa Dil Mein Hota Hain, Tum Ek Haseen Ho Laakhon Mein Bhala Paa Ke Tumhein Koi Khota Hain, Jiya O Jiya O Jiya Kuchh Bol Do (Train/Car Solo - Shankar-Jaikishan/Hasrat Jaipuri) - Jab Pyar Kisi Se Hota Hai 1961"      [O Ho, ..Aa Ha, ...]
 "O Kaal Teri Jholi Mein Kyaa Kyaa Bhare Humsathi Huyi Khushiyaa (Solo - Avinash Vyas/Mukhram Sharma) - RaajRaani Damayanti 1952"
 "O Kali Ghata Ghir Aayi Re O O Bajane Lagi Shehnai Re Ho O Madhur Milan Hai Sajana De Re Na De Re Na (Duet Lata Mangeshkar - Shankar-Jaikishan/Hasrat Jaipuri) - Kali Ghata 1951"      [O O O O O O ... ]
 "O Kali Topi Wale, O Kali Topi Wale Zara Naam To Bata, O Kali Topi Wale Zara Naam To Bata, O Gore Gore, O Gore Gore Gaalon Wali Naam To Bata, O Gore Gore Gaalon Wali Naam To Bata (Duet Asha Bhosle - Chitragupt/Majrooh Sultanpuri) - Kali Topi Lal Rumal 1959"
 "O Karni Bharni Ke Dum Se Hi Chalta Yeh Sansaar (Solo - Sonik-Omi/Saraswati Kumar Deepak) - Do Sholay 1977"
 "O Khamosh Zamana Hain (Duet Asha Bhosle - Anil Biswas/Majrooh Sultanpuri) - Heer 1956"
 "O Koi Aane Ko Hai Dil Machalane Laga (Qawali Shamshad Begum - R. D. Burman) - Chhote Nawab 1961"      [Yak Byak Range Mahfil Badalne Laga ...]
 "O Koi Roko Ke Hum Pyaar Kar Ne Lage (Duet Asha Bhosle - Laxmikant-Pyarelal) - Kaala Paani 1980"
 "O Kul Devta Raksha Karo (Prayer Solo - Sardar Malik/Qamar Jalalabadi) - Chamak Chandni 1957"
 "O Lachhi O Lachhi Tu Man Ko Laage Achhi (Duet Binapani Mukherjee - Hansraj Behl-Azeez Khan/Mulkraj Bhakti) - Roomal 1949"
 "O Lafzo Mein Bayan Hi (Duet Manna Dey - Lala Asar Sattar/Madhukar Rajasthani) - Arabian Nights II 1967"
 "O Laxmi O Sarsu O Sheela O Rajani Dekho Kya Kya Le Kar Aaya Yeh Mausam Iss Baar Woh Gulaab Bhi Khilega Shayad Jis Ka Naam Hain Pyar (Outdoor Solo - Shankar-Jaikishan/Shailendra) - Kahin Aur Chal 1968"
 "O Leela Sheela Bela Moti (Solo - Shivram Krishna/Asad Bhopali) - Rangeela Raja 1960"
 "O Lehriye Waanji O Motiya Wali O Lehra O Lehra O Lehra Hurrra Ha Hai Hai Hai ..Patanga, Patanga Jal Jal Jal Mar Jayein, Yeh Deepak Jhoom Jhoom Lehrayein, Yeh Deepak Lau Khushi Se Lagayein, Patanga Bhed Jaane Na Paayein (Duet Asha Bhosle - Shankar-Jaikishan) - Patanga 1970"
 "O Leke Pehla Pehla Pyaar Bhar Ke Aankhon Mein Khumar Jadunagari Se Aaya Hain Koi Jadugar, O Leke Pehla Pehla Pyaar Bhar Ke Aankhon Mein Khumar Jadunagari Se Aaya Hain Koi Jadugar, O Leke Pehla Pehla Pyaar Bhar Ke Aankhon Mein Khumar Jadunagari Se Aaya Hain Koi Jadugar, O Leke Pehla Pehla Pyaar Aa Aa 1 (Multi Asha Bhosle and Shamshad Begum - O. P. Nayyar/Majrooh Sultanpuri) - C. I. D. 1956"
 "O Leke Pehla Pehla Pyaar Bhar Ke Aankhon Mein Khumar Jadunagari Se Aaya Hain Koi Jadugar, O Leke Pehla Pehla Pyaar Bhar Ke Aankhon Mein Khumar Jadunagari Se Aaya Hain Koi Jadugar, O Leke Pehla Pehla Pyaar Bhar Ke Aankhon Mein Khumar Jadunagari Se Aaya Hain Koi Jadugar, O Leke Pehla Pehla Pyaar Aa Aa 2 (Multi Asha Bhosle and Shamshad Begum - O. P. Nayyar/Majrooh Sultanpuri) - C. I. D. 1956" 
 "O Lootne Wale Duniya Ko … Loot Jayega (Duet Sudha Malhotra as Child - Husnlal-Bhagatram/Prem Dhawan) - Dushman 1957"
 "O Maati Ke Puthle (Solo - Madan Mohan Kohli/Kaif Irfani) - Sheroo 1957"
 "O Madam Nancy You Are My Fancy (Duet Asha Bhosle - O. P. Nayyar/Qamar Jalalabadi) - Basant 1960"
 "O Mahi O O Mahi O, Duppataa Mera De De, Duppataa Mera De De, De De (Duet Lata Mangeshkar - Husnlal-Bhagatram/Qamar Jalalabadi) - Meena Bazaar 1950"      [O O O ...]
 "O Main Hoon Shahi Lakadhaara (Duet Asha Bhosle - Vinod/Verma Malik) - Jalwa 1955"
 "O Main Suraj Hoon Tu Meri Kiran Sang Tera Rahe, Main Aag Mein Tere Jal JAaoon Dil Mera Kahe O O O Aa Aa Aa (Horse-Cart Duet Asha Bhosle - Sonik-Omi/G. L. Rawal) - Dil Ne Phir YAad Kiya 1966"      [Aa Aa HAa ...]
 "O Mama (Multi Lata Mangeshkar and Nitin Mukesh - Shankar-Jaikishan) - Do Jhooth 1975"      [Na Mujhko Hichki Aayi Na Pao Mera Fisla ...]
 "O Maujo Mein Chhupa Sahil (Duet Manna Dey - - Lala Asar Sattar/Madhukar Rajasthani) - Arabian Nights II 1967"
 "O Mehanat Kash Insaan Jag Utha Lo Dharti Ke Bhag Jage (Duet Asha Bhosle - S. D. Burman) - Insaan Jag Utha 1959"
 "O Mera Imaan Tujh Pe Kurbaan (Multi Manna Dey - Sonik-Omi/M. G. Hashmat) - Pandit Aur Pathaan 1977"
 "O Mere Be-chain Dil Ko Chain Tune Diya, Shukriya Shukriya (Solo - Kalyanji-Anandji/Anand Bakshi) - Aamne Saamne 1967"
 "O Mere Dildar Na Kar Tu Inkar (Duet Asha Bhosle - N. Dutta aka Datta Naik/Farooq Qaiser) - Choron Ka Chor 1970"
 "O Mere Khuda (Solo - Lala Asar Sattar/Farooq Qaiser) - Saat Sawaal 1971"
 "O Mere Paradesi Jogi ..Tu Been Baja Sajana (Duet Asha Bhosle - Sonik-Omi) - Khoon Ki Takkar 1980"
 "O Mere Pyaro Zameen Ke Taro Jana Tumhe Hai Kahaan (Multi Asha Bhosle and Sudha Malhotra as Children - S. Mohinder/Pandit Indra) - Zameen Ke Tare 1960"      [Aa Aa Aa ..Ho ...]
 "O Mere Shah E Khuban O Meri Jaane Jana Na Tum Mere Paas Hote Ho Koi Doosra Nahin Hota 1 (Solo - Shankar-Jaikishan/Hasrat Jaipuri) - Love In Tokyo 1966 and Mohammed Rafi Collection Vol. 5 ****"
 "O Mere Sona Re Sona Re Sona Re De Doongi Jaan Juda Mat Hona Re (Duet Asha Bhosle - R. D. Burman/Majrooh Sultanpuri) - Teesri Manzil 1966"
 "O Mere Yaar Tommy, Deta Hoon Main Salaami, Rusta Na Rok Mera Jaane De, (Duet Dog - Laxmikant-Pyarelal/Anand Bakshi) - Night In London 1967"      [(Dog Bark) ...]
 "O Meri Baby Doll Haan Ya Naa Kuch To Bol ..Dil Ki Baat, Mere Dil Ki Baa,t Mere Dil Ki Baat, Sun Jaa (Swing (Jive) Solo - Shankar-Jaikishan/Shailendra) - Ek Phool Chaar Kaante 1960"      [O Yaa Yaa ..Diga ..Diga ..Diga ..O O ]
 "O Meri Bulbul-E-Baghdad (Duet Asha Bhosle  - S. Mohinder/Raja Mehdi Ali Khan) - Naya Paisa 1958"
 "O Meri Gaadi Gaadi, Kaun Kehta Hain Khatari, Chahe Sidhi Chahe Aadi, Ab To Chali Jaa Re, O Ab To Chali Jaa, Kaise Chalegi Gaadi Tu To Hain Re Anadi Are Re Re De Dhakka De De De Dhakka (Car Geeta Dutt - Bulo C. Rani) - Black Tiger 1960"
 "O Meri Ladli, Pyari Bahena, Rani Bahena, Tu Mere Hote Huye, Aansoo-on Mein Nahin Bahena, O O O ..Maan Liya Maine Tera Kehna, Yehin Kehna O Tera Kehna (Waltz Hemlata - Ravindra Jain/Ravindra Jain) - Aatish I 1979"
 "O Meri Mahbooba, Mahbooba Mahbooba Tujhe Jaana Hai To Jaa (Solo - Laxmikant-Pyarelal/Anand Bakshi) - Dharam Veer 1977"
 "O Meri Maina (Duet Kishore Kumar - Shankar-Jaikishan/Shailendra) - Crorepati 1961"
 "O Meri Saas Ke Ladke (Duet Asha Bhosle - Avinash Vyas/Kavi Pradeep) - Chakradhari 1954"
 "O Meri Sun Le Deen-Dayal, Kar De Mujh Ko Maala-Maal, O Meri Lottery Nikal Murliwale Nandlal, Meri Sun Le Din-Dayal (Prayer Solo - Shyamji GhanShyamji/Sajan Dehlvi) - Thokar 1974"
 "O Mister Banjo (Duet Asha Bhosle - O. P. Nayyar/Majrooh Sultanpuri) - Hum Sab Chor Hain 1956"
 "O Murakh Insaan Apne Ko Pehchaan (Message - Mohammad Shafi/Anjum Jaipuri) - Annadata I 1952"
 "O My Lovely Darling, Let Me Tell You Something Un Un Un Un Yeh Surkh Hont Aise Hain Jaise Jhalkata Hua Paimana, O My Lovely Darling, Let Me Tell You Something Un Un Un Un Aankhen Tumhari Aisi Jaisa Bahakata Hua Maikhana (Duet Asha Bhosle - N. Dutta aka Datta Naik/Shri Ram Saaz) - Return Of Johnny 1972" 
 "O Nanhe Se Farishte Tujh Se Yeh Kaisa Nata Kaise Yeh Dil Ke Rishte (Birthday Munna Solo - Ravi/Prem Dhawan) - Ek Phool Do Mali 1969"
 "O Nazuk Nazuk Badan Mora, Haaye Chubh Chubh Jaye Re Tore Nain Sawariya Haaye Haaye Haaye Tore Nain Sawariya (Duet Lata Mangeshkar - Chitragupt) - Aulad-2 1968"
 "O O More Baalma Kaahe Maari Kataar Haay Daiya (Duet Shamshad Begum - Ghulam Mohammad/Shakeel Badayuni) - Shair 1949"
 "O O O O O O ...(Solo - Naushad Ali/Shakeel Badayuni) - Sohni Mahiwal 1958" (Mahiwal's Call + Music)
 "O Paise To Bhagwan Nahin (Duet Manna Dey - Chitragupt/Majrooh Sultanpuri) - Main Shadi Kar Ne Chala 1962"
 "O Paise Walo Kaisa Tumhara (Solo - Chitragupt/I. C. Kapoor) - Chand Mere Aaja 1960"
 "O Pape Na Sharma Kuchh Garmi Warmi Kha (Solo - Ravi/Rajendra Krishan) - Sagaai 1966"
 "O Peter O Brother Harry O Mirna O Mister Barry Mister Aayyar Are You There Hum Tum Jise Kahta Hai Shadi You Know Hai Pura Barbadi ..Mind You Jayegi Aazadi (Solo - S. D. Burman) - Kaagaj Ke Phool 1959"
 "O Piya Re Ji Chalo Baagh Ki Sair Ko Chale (Duet Asha Bhosle - Basant Prakash/Shailendra) - Badnaam 1952"
 "O Pyari Meri Mona (Duet Suraiya - Sardul Kwatra/Prakash Bakshi) - Goonj 1952"
 "O Raat Ke Musafir Chanda Zara Bata De Mera Qasoor Kya Hain, Tu Faisla Suna De, O Raat Ke Musafir, Chanda Zara Bata De, Mera Qasoor Kya Hain, Tu Faisla Suna De (Duet Lata Mangeshkar - Hemant Kumar/Rajendra Krishan) - Miss Mary 1957"
 "O Radhe Shyam Bol (Janmashthami Multi Suman Kalyanpur, Kaushi Geedwani and T. B. Husain - Bulo C. Rani/Prem Warbartani) - Haqdaar 1964"
 "O Rajeshwari O Parameshwari O Bhadeshwari Badi Hai Shohrat Tumhaare Hoton Tumhaari Aankho Ki (Duet Asha Bhosle - R. D. Burman) - Dil Ka Raaja 1972"
 "O Rekha Tujhe Dekha Jab Se (Qawali Duet Asha Bhosle - K. Babuji/Anjaan) - Naya Bakra 1979"
 "O Roop Ki Raani Dekh (Duet Asha Bhosle - Sonik-Omi/Verma Malik) - Sazaa 1972"
 "O Saathi O Saathi O ..O Saathi O Saathi O (Waltz Solo - Usha Khanna/Yogesh Gaud) - HoneyMoon 1973"      [Din Hain Bahar Ke, Phool Chun Le Pyar Ke, ...]
 "O Sanam Main Tujhe Pukaroon Sanam (Duet Suraiya - Husnlal Bagatram/Qamar Jalalabadi) - Sanam 1951"
 "O Sanam Mera Saath Dena (Duet Suman Kalyanpur - Dattaram Wadkar/Farooq Qaiser) - Beqasoor 1969"
 "O Sanam Tere Ho Gayen Hum Pyar Mein Tere Kho Gaye Hum (Duet Lata Mangeshkar - Shankar-Jaikishan/Shailendra) - Ayee Milan Ki Bela 1964"
 "O Sapanon Ke Raja (Duet Lata Mangeshkar - Laxmikant-Pyarelal/Anand Bakshi) - Banphool 1971"      [O Sapnon Ki Rani, Tu Jahaan Main Wahaan, Tu Jidhar Main Oodhar, Nagar Nagar Dagar Dagar, Ik Raah ke Hum Raahi Hum Raahi, Tu Chor Main Sipahi, Nahin Tu Chor Main Sipahi ...]
 "O Sheronwali (Duet Asha Bhosle - Laxmikant Pyarelal/Anand Bakshi) - Suhaag 1979"
 "O Shola Badan (Solo - Laxmikant-Pyarelal/Anand Bakshi) - Dil Aur Deewaar 1978"
 "O Soniya Matwaliya (Duet Asha Bhosle - Kalyanji-Anandji/Anand Bakshi) - Tamanna 1969"
 "O Soniye O Soniye Jab Jeet Huyi Humari (Duet Geeta Dutt - Ram Ganguly/Shyam Hindi) - Ten O' Clock 1958"
 "O Sun Lo Chhoti Arajiya (Solo - Ravi) - Nai Maa 1960"
 "O Tera Bitwa Jawan Hoi Gawaa (Duet Asha Bhosle - Laxmikant-Pyarelal/Anand Bakshi) - Gautam-Govinda 1979"
 "O Tera Chhup Chhup Ke Chale Aana (Duet Kamal Barot - Lala Asar Sattar/Madhukar Rajasthani) - Sangram 1965"
 "O Tere Athroo (Solo - R. D. Burman/Rajendra Krishan) - Shehzada 1972"
 "O Teri Kanak Di Rakhi Mundia O Main Nahi Panti (Duet Shamshad Begum - Hansraj Behl) - Do Laachian 1959"
 "O Teri Kheton Ki Rakhwali (Duet Suman Kalyanpur - Usha Khanna/Verma Malik) - Deedar 1970"
 "O Zalima Chala Kahan (Solo - Chitragupt/Majrooh Sultanpuri) - Zimbo 1958"
 "O Zara Dekh Ke Chalna, Haaye Haaye Haaye Haaye O Zara Dekh Ke Chalna Gori O Mar Nazuk Hain Badi Dori (Solo - Laxmikant-Pyarelal/Majrooh Sultanpuri) - Bikhre Moti 1971"
 "O Zindagi Tu Jhoom Le Zara (Solo - S. D. Burman/Shakeel Badayuni) - Kaise Kahoon 1964"
 "Oh Allah Meri Khair Ho (Solo - Laxmikant-Pyarelal/Hasrat Jaipuri) - Aakhri Dao 1975"      [Dekhein Kahan Par, Girti Hain Bijali, Gussa Hain Ya Toofan ...Oh Allah, ...]
 "Oh Darling I Love You (Duet Usha Khanna - Usha Khanna/Asad Bhopali) - Ek Paheli 1971"
 "Oh Duniyawalo Kaisa Tumhara Yeh Sansaar Hain Jhute Ki Jeet Yahan Sachche Ki Haar Hain 2 (Solo - Chitragupt) - Chand Mere Aaja 1960"
 "Oh Ek Shokh Haseena Se (Duet Manna Dey - R. D. Burman/Majrooh Sultanpuri) - Chandi Sona 1977"
 "Oh Ganga Oh Bindu Oh Ganga (Multi Asha Bhosle and Sharda Sinha - Datta Naik/Shamshul Huda Bihari-Khalik-Aziz Kasmiri-Shad Fidayi) - Ganga 1974"
 "Oh Harjaie Ki Main Hoon Paraie (Multi Asha Bhosle and Sharda Sinha - Datta Naik/Shamshul Huda Bihari-Khalik-Aziz Kasmiri-Shad Fidayi) - Ganga 1974"
 "Oh Jaani Aafat Tumhari Chunari Ka Palla Hoyega (Duet Asha Bhosle - Laxmikant-Pyarelal/Majrooh Sultanpuri) - Ek Aur Ek Gyarah 1981"
 "Oh Madam Nancy You Are My Fancy (Duet Asha Bhosle - O. P. Nayyar) - Basant 1960"
 "Oh Meri Chorni Oh Meri Morni Oh Main To Ho Chuka Tumhara (Duet Lata Mangeshkar - Kalyanji-Anandji/Anjaan) - Katilon Ka Katil 1981 and Evergreen Mohd Rafi ****"
 "Oh Meri Ladli Bahana (Duet Hemlata - Ravindra Jain) - Aatish 1979"
 "Oh My God, Oh My God Haseenon Ko Kyun De Di Tune Haaye Itni Beauty Har Deewana Aankh Ladana Samajhe Apni Duty Duty O My God (Duet Asha Bhosle - O. P. Nayyar/Raja Mehdi Ali Khan) - Hongkong 1962"
 "Oh Paisewalo Kaisa Tumhara Yeh Sansaar Hain Jhute Ki Jeet Yahan Sachche Ki Haar Hain 1 (Solo - Chitragupt) - Chand Mere Aaja 1960"
 "Oh Priyatama, Priyatama, Priyatama.. Naa Madhi Ninnu Pilichindi 1 (Telagu Solo - S. Hanumantha Rao/DR. C. Narayana Reddy) - Aaradhana 1976 and Dr C Narayana Reddy - Golden Memoirs and Legends N T Rama Rao - Vendi Thera Velupu"
 "Oh Priyatama, Priyatama, Priyatama.. Naa Madhi Ninnu Pilichindi 2 (Telagu Duet S. Janaki - S. Hanumantha Rao/DR. C. Narayana Reddy) - Aaradhana 1976"
 "Oi Dur Diganta Pare Jetha Aakash Matite Kanakani (Bengali Solo - Unknown/Pabitra Kumar Mitra) - Unknown 1958"
 "Om Bhagwati Dharam Ki Sachchai (Prayer Solo - S. Mohinder/Gopal Singh or Sinha Nepali) - Jai Bhawani 1961"
 "Om Namah Shivay (Solo - Chitragupt/Bharat Vyas) - Shiv Shakti 1980" 
 "Om Namah Shivaya (Solo - Avinash Vyas/Bharat Vyas) - Jagadguru Shankaracharya 1955" 
 "Om Shanti ..Man Mein Basi Jo Murat (Solo - Ravindra Jain/Ravindra Jain) - Ghar Ki Laaj 1979"
 "One Two Three Four, Dil Ka Tu Chor, Five Six Seven Eight, Oh You Are Great, Hut Hut Hut Hut, Hut Re Munh-chor, One Two Three Four (Swing [Jive] Duet Suman Kalyanpur - N. Dutta aka Datta Naik/Jan Nisar Akhtar) - Black Cat 1959"
 "Ooi Amma (Duet Lata Mangeshkar - Kalyanji-Anandji/Indeevar) - Dil Ne Pukara 1967"
 "Oonchi Edi Walon Ne Kat Ke Kat Ke Baalon Ne, Dil Mera Khinch Liya Tedi Thirachi Chaalo Ne (Swing Duet Geeta Dutt - Kalyanji Veerji Shah/Bharat Vyas) - Bedard Zamana Kya Jane 1959"      [O Bachke ...]
 "Oonchi Oonchi Baaton Se 2 (Duet Usha Mangeshkar - Rajesh Roshan/Anand Bakshi) - Mr. Natwarlal 1979"
 "Oopar Dekho Ya Neeche Aage Dekho Ya Peeche Ya~a~a Dekho Daye Baaye Bas Hum Hi Hum Nazar Aaye, Suno Ji Jati Kahaan Ho Ha Ha Ha (Engagement Solo - Shankar-Jaikishan/Gulshan Bawra) - Aan Baan 1971"      [Ae Ae Ae-Ae ]
 "Oye Soniya Matwaliya Main Jaan Gayi Dilwaaliya Akela Mohe Jaan Ke Tu Ruste Mein Chhedega (Duet Asha Bhosle - Kalyanji-Anandji) - Tamanna 1969"      [Hain O O O ...]

See also 
 List of songs recorded by Mohammed Rafi
 Recorded songs (A)
 Recorded songs (B-C)
 Recorded songs (D-F)
 Recorded songs (G)
 Recorded songs (H-I)
 Recorded songs (J)
 Recorded songs (K)
 Recorded songs (L)
 Recorded songs (M)
 Recorded songs (N)
 Recorded songs (P-R)
 Recorded songs (S)
 Recorded songs (T)
 Recorded songs (U-Z)

O
Rafi, Mohammed